John Henry Colclough (c. 1769 – 28 June 1798) was United Irishman, who was executed in Wexford following the Irish Rebellion of 1798.

Life
He was born circa 1769 into an old landowning Wexford family, the son of Thomas Francis Colclough and lived at Ballyteigue, Kilmore. He went abroad to study medicine and qualified as a doctor. On his return to Wexford he married Elizabeth Berry.

Colclough became involved with the United Irishmen who, seeking to secure for Ireland a representative national government, determined upon a republican insurrection against the British Crown. Responding, it was later claimed, to pressure from his tenants,.
he was then seen in the company of the rebels at the Battle of New Ross.

After the rebel defeat, he fled with his wife and Bagenal Harvey to the Greater Saltee Island, from whence they planned to escape to republican France. 
They were betrayed under torture by a local farmer, arrested, and brought to Wexford town to be court-martialled.
Found guilty, they were hanged on Wexford bridge on 28 June 1798, their heads afterwards put on spikes and their bodies thrown into the River Slaney. Colclough's body was recovered by his supporters during the night and buried in St. Patrick's burying ground, Wexford.

See also
 Wexford Rebellion of 1798
 Bagenal Harvey, Cornelius Grogan, Matthew Keogh, Philip Roche, John Kelly of Killanne - Rebel leaders hanged on Wexford bridge, 28 June 1798

References

Sources
 
 
 
 

1798 deaths
People executed by the Kingdom of Great Britain
People executed by the British military by hanging
United Irishmen
People from County Wexford
Executed Irish people
Year of birth uncertain